An online school (virtual school, e-school, or cyber-school) teaches students entirely or primarily online or through the Internet. It has been defined as "education that uses one or more technologies to deliver instruction to students who are separated from the instructor and to support regular and substantive interaction between the students. Online education exists all around the world and is used for all levels of education (K-12 High school/secondary school, college, or graduate school). This type of learning enables the individuals to earn transferable credits, take recognized examinations, and advance to the next level of education over the Internet.

Virtual education is most commonly used in high school and college. 30-year-old students or older tend to study online programs at higher rates. This group represents 41% of the online education population, while 35.5% of students ages 24–29 and 24.5% of students ages 15–23 participate in virtual education.

Virtual education is becoming increasingly used worldwide. There are currently more than 4,700 colleges and universities that provide online courses to their students. In 2015, more than 6 million students were taking at least one course online, this number grew by 3.9% from the previous year. 29.7% of all higher education students are taking at least one distance course. The total number of students studying on a campus exclusively dropped by 931,317 people between the years 2012 and 2015. Experts say that because the number of students studying at the college level is growing, there will also be an increase in the number of students enrolled in distance learning.

Instructional models vary, ranging from distance learning types which provide study materials for independent self-paced study, to live, interactive classes where students communicate with a teacher in a class group lesson. Class sizes range widely from a small group of 6 pupils or students to hundreds in a virtual school.

The courses that are independent and self-paced are called asynchronous courses. Typically for this type of learning, the students are given the assignments and information and are expected to complete the assignments by the due date. This is done on their own time. There is no scheduled time when the class meets. Usually, the only interactions that take place are through discussion boards, blogs, and wikis.

On the other hand, synchronous online courses happen in real-time. The instructor and students all interact online at the same time. This is done either through text, video, or audio chat. Therefore, these lessons are socially constructed. In addition to the scheduled class time, there are usually additional assignments to complete. A key to keeping Kindergartners engaged in distance learning can be challenging. Individualizing lessons and giving mini breaks can help students stay engaged during short synchronous sessions. As an educator you have to find creative ways to keep children attention on the screen especially since they're in the comfort of their home with all their toys and all the other luxuries within the house they desire. It is hard to keep their attention in the classroom so virtual learning now becomes extremely harder.

Secondary school age students have to be extremely disciplined and focused in order to be successful in virtual learning. Just like being at an actual school, these pre-teens and teenagers have to make sure they are presentable/looking good before logging onto their classes and have to greet all of their friends and turn off their cellphones before the lesson begins because that will be a big distraction for them just as it would in the classroom. Some of the same problems that exist at school have the potential of existing at home with virtual school.

Hybrid, sometimes also called blended, courses are when students learn and interact both in-person and online. Theses classes meet in-person during the semester in addition to computer-based communication.

In 2020, the COVID-19 pandemic happened, and students around the world were forced to attend online school. Many students around the world didn't have tablets or computers to attend to online schools. In late 2020-mid 2021, students were told that they can go to school like normal, and then later they were told to attend online and physically. When going to school, students were told to stay 6-feet apart each other, and wear masks.

Virtual school technology 
Virtual classrooms are made possible through the use of educational technology with the help of the internet. The internet itself can be credited on what enabled modern distance learning to be developed. The internet plays a role in virtual classrooms with resources such as virtual test taking functions, systems that aide coursework that include electronic reading materials, video conferencing for lectures and chatrooms. During the COVID-19 pandemic, the United States began to encourage social distancing in the education system. One use of technology that was found to be resourceful in the collaboration of students and teachers in virtual learning was the use of video conferencing. The utilization of web video conferencing allows students to communicate virtually with their teachers and simulate a classroom environment, with many using services such as Zoom and Cisco WebEx. To engage virtual students even further, a process known as gamification can be used to teach a student learning material in a form of a game to bring more enjoyment in a student's learning experience. Secondlife, an online virtual world, is a type of gamification system that is used for online educational purposes. Secondlife can be used as a substitute for face to face learning. It has qualities that resembles an in person curriculum such as class discussions, participation in lectures, and completing assignments. Gamification can also serve as an aide to increase a student's intrinsic motivation. The use of rewarding points while a student is using a gamification system can enhance internal motivation and motivate the student to accomplish learning goals from the game's objective. During the COVID-19 pandemic, many schools turned to virtual learning.

Costs and accessibility 
Where online methods are integrated with State provision, costs follow state school standards. Otherwise, fees must be met by the student or parents. Many US school districts are now creating their own online services to avoid paying external providers. Such students can graduate from their home district without ever leaving home. In most of these cases, students are given computers, books, and even Internet service to complete coursework from home.

With the resources of the Internet as a library, and the ease of making online study materials, there is usually a comparatively small requirement for textbooks. Most courses will provide electronic materials free of cost, or included in the course fee. Textbooks are most often required for an exam syllabus course.

Advantages and disadvantages of online education 

Potential advantages:

 Personal circumstances or health disruptions, specifically contagious viruses such as COVID-19 and the Common cold, or injuries will not halt learning since the physical demands are much less.
 Digital transcripts of lessons can additionally help absent students with learning missed curriculum.
 Online learning is ideal for students and families who need flexible arrangements. However, synchronous learning does impose limits due to time zones.
 The integration of Internet resources provides a huge library of content, and students quickly become proficient with online research, resources, and tools.
 Greater flexibility enables independent students such as self-learners or gifted students to explore learning beyond the standard curriculum, pursue individual skills and ambitions, or develop at their own preferred pace using online resources. Part-time students with jobs or family commitments may benefit from the flexibility of online schedules.
 Online schools can be equalizers, as age, appearance, and background are far less obvious, and therefore this can minimize harassment, prejudice, or discrimination. Instead, groups are categorized by personal ability.
 Students may benefit from exposure to others in different cultures of the world, which can enrich their understanding of history, geography, religions and politics, and develops social skills.
 Online education may collaboratively engage in or discuss universal or real-world issues, which are necessary skills for a successful career.
 Increased accessibility to remote education for poor or rural areas where commuting to schools or lack of resources are concerns.
 Increased opportunities may allow a student to take more courses they are interested in that are not offered near them.
 Cost-effective for schools or districts since it allows teachers to instruct more students than in a face-to-face classroom setting.
Online courses may be less expensive for students than traditional classes since less resources may be required. Additionally, many learning resources online are free, easy to access, self-paced, and beginner-friendly.

Potential disadvantages:

 Remote learning can reduce engagement, interaction, and lead to a lack of socialization, which can potentially decrease a student's social competence or skills such as their ability to cooperate with others.
 A home or online environment may potentially be more distracting or disrupting than a physical school environment.
 Organizing an online school may be more expensive and more complicated to organize or lead.
 Those without access to technology or devices would not have access to virtual education. Although some schools may offer students borrowed devices, those who do not have access can easily fall behind. 
 Many virtual schools are relatively new and inexperienced, and therefore may be unfit for educating students properly.
 Technology or the Internet can be more unpredictable since it may be vulnerable to power outages, Internet outages, hacks, exploits, online trolling, glitches, or errors that can potentially be more difficult to fix or deal with when online.
 Potential employers may be skeptical of the credibility of online degrees and virtual programs.
 Cheating online may be easier or more tempting since online resources may be more accessible and restrictions or consequences may be more lenient. The increased anonymity online may further encourage or allow the continuance of misbehavior such as trolling.
 Online schools may be too lenient or disengaging, thus may potentially encourage or harbor potentially damaging and undisciplined behavior that could threaten a student's future or career.
 Not using the physical tools might diminish a student's ability or competence.
 Online can be potentially limiting since physical activities or hands on activities, specifically for courses like Physical education, Art, and Chemistry, may be more difficult to engage in or occur less frequent. Online classes might take away the value of the active elements that some courses require, and do not offer the same teacher-student relationships. Students might also not experience the same critical thinking, observation, creating, and creative skills.

Studies 
Online Education providers in the United Kingdom are not currently eligible for accreditation by the Department for Education and therefore it is difficult to measure quality of providers. Following a consultation process that began in 2019, The DFE and Ofsted are currently working towards a pilot online education provider accreditation scheme using a variation of the Independent School Inspectorate Inspection framework.

As claimed in a study done by Eric Bettinger and Susanna Loeb, on average, online students "do substantially worse than students in the same face-to-face course". Furthermore, students who attend K-12 online consistently perform worse on state tests than their peers in brick and mortar environments, even when taking into account prior achievement.

See also
Educational technology
List of virtual schools
School website
Virtual campus
Virtual learning environment
Virtual school library
Online university
University of the People

References

Alternative education
Distance education
Educational technology
Internet culture